Märchen der Welt – Puppenspiel der kleinen Bühne is a West German television series.

See also
List of German television series

External links
 

1979 German television series debuts
1987 German television series endings
German children's television series
German-language television shows
Television shows based on fairy tales
German television shows featuring puppetry
Das Erste original programming